Artix is a commune in the Pyrénées-Atlantiques department in the Nouvelle-Aquitaine region of south-western France.

The inhabitants of the commune are known as Artisiens or Artisiennes.

Geography

Artix is located some 12 km north-west of Lescar and 14 km south-east of Orthez. Access to the commune is by main road D817 from Lacq in the north-west passing through the commune and south of the town and continuing south-east to Denguin. Access to the town from the D817 is on the D280 which links the two ends of the bypass. There are also the D263 road going north to Urdès, the D663 going north-east to Serres-Sainte-Marie, the D32 going east to Cescau, and the D281 going south-east to join the D33 north-west of Noguères. The A64 autoroute also passes through the north-eastern corner with Exit 9 exiting to the D817 in the commune.

The SNCF Toulouse-Bayonne railway line also passes through the commune with Artix station just south of the town centre. The Interurban network of Pyrénées-Atlantiques busline has two routes passing through the commune: Route 801 (Orthez-Pau) and Route 802 (Artix-Pau).

Apart from the town there are the villages of Cap de Lalanne and Le Plateau. Some 40% of the commune is residential with the balance farmland with patches of forest.

The Gave de Pau flows north-west past the southern border of the commune with some branches touching the border. The Ruisseau Laulouze flows from the east through the south of the commune and joins Le Ruisseau which flows north-west parallel to the Gave de Pau until it joins the river west of the commune just south of Lacq. The Agle also flows west through the northern corner of the commune to join the Gave de Pau south of Lacq.

Places and Hamlets

 Près l'Agle
 Auta
 Les Baigts
 Baradat
 Bernata
 Cabille
 Cambayou
 Camous
 Campagnolle
 Candaus
 La Castanhère (château)
 Le Castérot
 Cité
 Cortigue
 Cuyala (Cor de)
 Les Esquirous
 Geil
 Les Grabes
 Labourdette
 Cap de Lalanne
 Larrecq
 Larrieu-Lôme
 Lauguère
 Laviecave
 Lavignasse
 Lavigne
 Le Moulin
 Pendix
 Le Plateau
 Pondix
 Pont Mayou
 Porte Neuve
 Poumetche
 Rémy
 Rey
 Saligot
 Sarrailla
 Taulat
 Toch

Toponymy
The name Artix appears in the forms: 
Artits (1286), 
Artics (13th century, Fors de Béarn), 
Artidz (1350, Notaries of Pardies), 
Artitz (1385, Census of Béarn), 
Arthitz (1440, Census of Bastide-Monréjau),
Artixs (1538, Reformation of Béarn), 
Artix in 1583, in the Reformation of Béarn, and on the Cassini Map of 1750.

Its name in béarnais is Artics. Michel Grosclaude indicated that the name Artix possibly was formed from the mediterranean radical arte ("green oak" then "undergrowth") and the collective and locative basque suffix -itz. He proposed them in the sense "Vegetation of the undergrowth".

Laviecave is a hamlet mentioned in 1863 but Paul Raymond recommended the spelling La Vie-Cave, meaning the sunken way or path: la via cava.

History
The commune once had a Lay Abbey, vassal of the Viscounts of Béarn. In 1385 Artix was a small village under the bailiwick of Pau with only 10 fires grouped around the church. In 1880 the old church was demolished. The new church was opened in 1899.

The village became a city after the creation of the Royal Road under Henri IV which then became Imperial Route 117, then the Route nationale 117. This opening up allowed the market at Artix to flourish and the city to grow in importance.

Heraldry

Administration

List of Successive Mayors

Inter-communality
The commune is part of five inter-communal structures:
 the Communauté de communes de Lacq-Orthez;
 the SIVU for the Agle and the Lacq;
 the association for water and sanitation of Trois Cantons;
 the Energy association of Pyrénées-Atlantiques;
 the inter-communal association for defence against flooding of the Gave de Pau;

Twinning
Artix has twinning associations with:
 Sacedón (Spain) since 1992.
 Song-naaba (Burkina Faso) since 1995.

Demography
In 2017 the commune had 3,428 inhabitants.

Economy
Artix has a prevention plan for technological risks due to some chemical establishments in the commune, similar to Bésingrand, Os-Marsillon, Noguères, Mourenx, and Pardies.

The Groupe Olano has a site in Artix specialising in the storage and transport of chocolate.

Culture and heritage

Religious heritage

The Parish Church of Saint-Pierre (19th century) is registered as an historical monument.

Cultural and environmental heritage
The Béarnais polyphonic group Los Pagalhós, created in the 1970s, was born in Artix.

Villages in Béarn are permitted to display street signs in Occitan. Artix was the first commune in France of more than 3,000 inhabitants to implement Bilingual signs throughout the commune in occitan (Gascon béarnais) and French.  Consequently, its signs show its name as "Artics", since the letter X is little used in the Bearnais dialect.

Artix also has an Occitan language school or Calandreta.

Facilities

Education
Artix has two elementary schools (Moulin and Sarrailh), one college (College Jean Moulin), and one calandreta with a childcare nursery and a primary school.

Sports and associations
Artix Basketball Club.

Notable people linked to the commune
Maurice Plantier, born in 1921 at Biarritz and died in 2006 at Paris, was a French politician. He was mayor of Artix from 1960 to 1989.
Ramesh Kumar Nibhoria, born in Chandigarh , India, inventor of many biomass energy equipment for space heating and cooking. He is winner of many awards including Ashden Awards and has applied 16 patents. Since June, 2017, he started living here to explore bioenergy technologies business in France and Africa.

See also
Communes of the Pyrénées-Atlantiques department

References

External links

Artix official website 
Artix on Géoportail, National Geographic Institute (IGN) website 
Artix on the 1750 Cassini Map

Communes of Pyrénées-Atlantiques